Delting Up Helly Aa (known as Brae Up Helly Aa until 2001) is the final festival in the Shetland Islands' Up Helly Aa calendar, taking place on the third Friday of March in the parish of Delting.

History

The festival was originally held by Brae Junior High School, the first being held in 1970. The school continued to hold the festival until 1979, and the remaining 'junior' festivals were held by parents and staff from the school. The Senior and Junior festivals had a two-year overlap, the first Senior festival in 1981, the last Junior festival in 1982.

Since the beginning of the senior festival, the Jarl's Squad lunch has taken place at various locations associated with Sullom Voe Terminal. It was held on board TEV Rangatira in 1981, at Firth Camp in 1982, at Sullom Voe & Brae Sailing Club in 1983, and Firth Camp again in 1984. In 1985 it was held in the Fraser Peterson Centre, the Sullom Voe Terminal canteen in 1986, the Fraser Peterson Centre again in 1987, and on board the accommodation rig Safe Lancia in 1988 and 1989. The lunch took place in the Fraser Peterson Centre every year between 1990 and 1997, and the Mid Brae Inn played host in 1998. It has been held in the Mossbank Community Hall with the Manager of Sullom Voe Terminal since 1999.

The original Galley Shed was demolished in 2016, with the new shed officially opened in June 2018. The Galley Shed was opened by Harold Johnson, who was the first 'senior' Delting Up Helly Aa Guizer Jarl in 1981.

Delting Up Helly Aa has been postponed several times in its history, once in 2007 following a death in the community, and a number of times due to the Coronavirus pandemic. Originally rescheduled to take place at the end of October 2020, it was pushed back to March 2021, then March 2022, and again to March 2023.

The Day's Events 

On the morning of Delting Up Helly Aa, the Jarl's squad gather at the Northern Lights Function Room in Brae. The squad proceeds to march to the Galley Shed, where the Bill can be seen, and where the galley stands on display. The Delting Up Helly Aa flag, which depicts Sleipnir, is raised at the Galley Shed. The squad then visits Lunnasting, Brae, and Mossbank Primary Schools (Olnafirth Primary was also visited until 2014), followed by lunch in the Mossbank Community Hall.

The squads muster at the Northern Lights Function Room, making their way up to the Brae Hall, where they receive torches ahead of the light up. The squads make their way through Brae, singing the Up Helly Aa song. The procession terminates at the Delting Boating Club, where the galley is set alight, and floated out into Busta Voe. The Norseman's Home is then sung, before the squads then make their way around the halls to perform their acts. The halls which open on the night are the Brae Hall, Delting Boating Club, Mossbank Hall, Voe Hall and Vidlin Hall. The Jarl's Squad visit the halls in the opposite direction to the rest of the squads.

The following day is known as "Hop Day", with various premises open with live music and entertainment. The Jarl's Squad pay visits to each event taking place.

List of Guizer Jarls

Junior Jarls

Senior Jarls

References

Up Helly Aa
Shetland culture
Traditions involving fire
March observances
Festivals in Scotland
Annual events in Scotland